General Rawlins may refer to:

Anthony Rawlins (fl. 1980s–2020s), Australian Army major general
James Rawlins (1823–1905), British Indian Army major general
John Aaron Rawlins (1831–1869), Union Army brigadier general and brevet major general
Stuart Blundell Rawlins (1897–1955), British Army major general

See also
Edwin W. Rawlings (1904–1997), U.S. Air Force general